Welcome to Paradise is an album by Randy Stonehill, released in 1976, on Solid Rock Records. The album was produced by Larry Norman, with Andy Johns doing the engineering. Stonehill, with producer Mark Heard, titled his 1989 album, Return to Paradise, a reference to the title of this record.

This album was listed at No. 13 in the 2001 book, CCM Presents: The 100 Greatest Albums in Christian Music. The album includes a rerecording of "Puppet Strings" from Get Me Out of Hollywood.

Track listing
All songs written by Randy Stonehill.
Side One: Paradise Lost (sorrow and sadness....)
 "King of Hearts"  – 4:53
 "Keep Me Runnin'"  – 5:57
 "The Winner (High Card)"  – 3:43
 "Lung Cancer"  – 3:31
 "Puppet Strings"  – 4:25

Side Two: Paradise Regained (....turn into gladness)
 "First Prayer"  – 3:08
 "I've Got News for You"  – 3:49
 "Song for Sarah"  – 3:28
 "Christmas Song for All Year 'Round"  – 3:56
 "Good News"  – 3:18

Personnel 
 Randy Stonehill – vocals, acoustic guitars
 Larry Norman – pianos, electric guitars, harmony vocals 
 Jon Linn – lead guitars
 Tim Ayers (The Mighty T-Bone) – bass guitar
 Mark Walker – drums
 Anthony Harris – charts and baton

Production notes
 Produced and Arranged by Larry Norman, a Solid Rock Studios Production. 
 Engineered by Andy Johns 
 Co-Engineered by Tom Trefethen
 Pre-Production recording at Solid Rock Recording Studios, 16trk/24trk at Mama Jo's and Sunset Sound.
 Mastered at Artisan Sound Recorders
 Larry Norman – photography and album design
 Joe Taylor – lettering

References

1976 albums
Randy Stonehill albums